Katsumoto (且元 or 勝元) is both a Japanese surname and a masculine Japanese given name meaning "victorious". Notable people with the surname include:

, deputy to the Shōgun
, Japanese samurai

Fictional characters:
 Katsumoto, hero of the film The Last Samurai
 Gordon Katsumoto, detective in the remake of Magnum P.I. played by Tim Kang

See also
 Katsumoto, a town on Iki Island
 Katsumoto, a So-Cal metalcore band signed to Uprising Records

Japanese masculine given names
Japanese-language surnames